Alopecosa edax is a wolf spider species in the genus Alopecosa found in Poland and China.

See also 
 List of Lycosidae species

References 

edax
Spiders of Europe
Spiders of China
Spiders described in 1875